Zeuzeropecten castaneus is a moth of the  family Cossidae. It is found in Madagascar.

This is a large heavy moth with a wingspan of 70 mm (male). The frontwings are white, with chestnut reticulations, a faint post-median line, and another near the base.
The hindwings are similar but duller.

References

Zeuzerinae
Moths described in 1914
Moths of Madagascar
Moths of Africa